Zhudong Township is an urban township in central Hsinchu County, Taiwan. Part of Hsinchu Science Park is in Zhudong. Also located in Zhudong is the main campus of the Industrial Technology Research Institute (ITRI). Zhudong is approximately 20 minutes drive from Hsinchu town center on one of two freeways, route 3 North, which passes nearby and route 68 East which proceeds directly through Zhudong.

Name
Literally, Zhudong means "bamboo east" but in this context, zhu is short for "Hsinchu".  Thus, Zhudong lies east of Hsinchu (cf. Zhubei which lies north [bei] of Hsinchu.)  The former name of the area was Chhiū-kí-nâ, literally " forest" with the present name adopted under Japanese rule in 1920.

Geography

 Area: 
 Population: 96,518 (February 2023)

Administrative divisions
Shangping, Ruifeng, Ruanqiao, Yuandong, Shangguan, Dongning, Zhongzheng, Daxiang, Zhongshan, Nanhua, Donghua, Shanghua, Jilin, Renai, Zhudong, Zhongxiao, Rongle, Ronghua, Wufeng, Liufeng, Sanchong, Erchong, Touchong, Yuanshan and Kehu Village.

Tourist attractions
Nearby is the mountain of Feifong Shan and Buddhist temples. A well-prepared path with steps and tiled and wooden walkways enables walking to the peak and the ridge overlooking Zhudong in all weather.

 Zhudong Animation and Comic Creative Park
 Zhudong Timber Industry Exhibition Hall

Transportation

Rail

Four TRA rail stations serve Zhudong: Ronghua, Shangyuan, Zhudong and Zhuzhong.

Taiwan High Speed Rail passes through the western part of the township, but there is no planned station.

Bus
Bus stations in the townships are:
 Xiagongguan Bus Station of Hsinchu Bus
 Zhudong Bus Station of Hsinchu Bus

Notable natives
 Cheng Yung-chin, Magistrate of Hsinchu County (2001-2009)
 Danny Wen, writer
 Lai Pi-hsia, musician
 Lu Shao-chia, conductor

References

Townships in Hsinchu County